Takane No.2 Dam is a hollow gravity dam located in Gifu Prefecture in Japan. The dam is used for power production. The catchment area of the dam is 173 km2. The dam impounds about 58  ha of land when full and can store 11927 thousand cubic meters of water. The construction of the dam was started on 1963 and completed in 1968.

References

Dams in Gifu Prefecture